Father of Four in the Snow is a 1954 Danish family film directed by Alice O'Fredericks and starring Ib Schønberg. It was produced under the ASA Film banner.

Cast
 Ib Schønberg as Far
 Birgitte Bruun as Søs
 Otto Møller Jensen as Ole
 Rudi Hansen as Mie
 Ole Neumann as Lille Per
 Peter Malberg as Onkel Anders
 Agnes Rehni as Naboen Agnes Sejersen
 Preben Neergaard as Fotograf Søren Petersen
 Leif B. Hendil as Chefredaktøren
 Ib Mossin as Peter
 Einar Juhl as Rektor
 Ernst Bruun Olsen as Journalisten
 Knud Heglund as Skotsk oberst
 Georg Hansen as Søren

External links

1954 films
1950s Danish-language films
Danish black-and-white films
Films directed by Alice O'Fredericks
Films scored by Sven Gyldmark
ASA Filmudlejning films
Father of Four
Danish comedy films
1954 comedy films